In mathematics, an astroid is a particular type of roulette curve: a hypocycloid with four cusps. Specifically, it is the locus of a point on a circle as it rolls inside a fixed circle with four times the radius. By double generation, it is also the locus of a point on a circle as it rolls inside a fixed circle with 4/3 times the radius. It can also be defined as the envelope of a line segment of fixed length that moves while keeping an end point on each of the axes. It is therefore the envelope of the moving bar in the Trammel of Archimedes.

Its modern name comes from the Greek word for "star". It was proposed, originally in the form of "Astrois", by Joseph Johann von Littrow in 1838. The curve had a variety of names, including tetracuspid (still used), cubocycloid, and paracycle. It is nearly identical in form to the evolute of an ellipse.

Equations
If the radius of the fixed circle is a then the equation is given by

This implies that an astroid is also a superellipse.

Parametric equations are

 

The pedal equation with respect to the origin is 

the Whewell equation is 

and the Cesàro equation is

The polar equation is

The astroid is a real locus of a plane algebraic curve of genus zero. It has the equation

The astroid is, therefore, a real algebraic curve of degree six.

Derivation of the polynomial equation
The polynomial equation may be derived from Leibniz's equation by elementary algebra:

Cube both sides:

Cube both sides again:

But since:

It follows that

Therefore:

or

Metric properties
Area enclosed

Length of curve

Volume of the surface of revolution of the enclose area about the x-axis.

Area of surface of revolution about the x-axis

Properties
The astroid has four cusp singularities in the real plane, the points on the star. It has two more complex cusp singularities at infinity, and four complex double points, for a total of ten singularities.

The dual curve to the astroid is the cruciform curve with equation 
The evolute of an astroid is an astroid twice as large.

The astroid has only one tangent line in each oriented direction, making it an example of a hedgehog.

See also
 Cardioid (epicycloid with one cusp)
 Nephroid (epicycloid with two cusps)
 Deltoid (hypocycloid with three cusps) 
 Stoner–Wohlfarth astroid a use of this curve in magnetics.
 Spirograph

References

External links 

 
 
 "Astroid" at The MacTutor History of Mathematics archive
 "Astroid" at The Encyclopedia of Remarkable Mathematical Forms
 Article on 2dcurves.com
 Visual Dictionary Of Special Plane Curves, Xah Lee
 Bars of an Astroid by Sándor Kabai, The Wolfram Demonstrations Project.

Sextic curves
Roulettes (curve)